Søren Frederiksen (born 27 January 1972) is a Danish former footballer who played as a forward. He scored 134 goals in the Danish Superliga championship, putting him second in the list of all-time topscorers. He played six games and scored one goal for the Denmark national team.

Frederiksen started his career in Frederikshavn fI, before moving to Viborg FF in 1989. He was an immediate success, and later he went on to become the top scorer of the Highest Danish League in 1993–1994 with 18 goals in 32 matches. He moved on to Silkeborg IF, and helped the club win the 1994 Superliga championship. As a result of the lack of playing time, he went back to Viborg in the following season. He then moved to league rivals Aalborg BK, and helped them win the 1999 Superliga title. In 2001, he moved back to Viborg. From 2003, he suffered a string of Achilles tendon injuries, and ended his career in 2005. At his retirement, the #22 shirt was retired by Viborg FF.

He went on to become head coach for Skive IK and later on assistant coach for Viborg FF. When Hans Eklund was fired in April 2009, Frederiksen was promoted to head coach. After the season, he stepped down to become assistant for new manager Lars Søndergaard.

In September 2017, Frederiksen was appointed as scout for Dutch Eredivisie club SC Heerenveen.

References

External links

 

1972 births
Living people
People from Frederikshavn
Danish men's footballers
Denmark international footballers
Denmark under-21 international footballers
Denmark youth international footballers
Association football forwards
Danish football managers
Danish Superliga players
AaB Fodbold players
Viborg FF players
Silkeborg IF players
Viborg FF managers
Skive IK managers
SC Heerenveen non-playing staff
Frederikshavn fI players
Sportspeople from the North Jutland Region